Aubagne station (French: Gare d'Aubagne) is a railway station serving the town of Aubagne, Bouches-du-Rhône department, southeastern France. It is situated on the Marseille–Ventimiglia railway. The station is served by regional trains (TER Provence-Alpes-Côte d'Azur) to Marseille and Toulon.

The station will be the centre of a planned tram network. The first line is complete and runs from the station to Le Charrel. A second line to Auriol and La Bouilladisse, named Val’Tram, is scheduled for operation in 2025.

References

TER Provence-Alpes-Côte-d'Azur
Railway stations in France opened in 1858
Railway stations in Bouches-du-Rhône